The Blue is the fifth extended play by South Korean girl group April. It was released on March 12, 2018 by DSP Media and distributed by LOEN Entertainment. This EP consists of six track including the title track "The Blue Bird".

Background and release
On February 26, 2018, DSP Media confirmed that April's comeback was set for March 12. On February 27, the agency released the comeback schedule for the album. On February 28, the album's track list was revealed.

On March 1, DSP Media released the first set of the member's individual teaser images, followed on March 2, by the second set of individual teaser images. On March 6, a whispered lyrics spoiler video was released. On March 7, the MV teaser for the lead single "The Blue Bird" was posted on the group's YouTube channel. On March 9, the highlight medley for the album was released. The official video for "The Blue Bird" was posted on the group's YouTube channel on March 12.

Track listing

Release history

References

2018 EPs
April (girl group) albums
Korean-language EPs
Kakao M EPs
DSP Media albums